Membury Castle is an Iron Age hill fort situated above the village of Membury in Devon. The fort occupies a commanding hilltop position some 204 metres above sea level with views across both the Yarty and Axe valleys.

References

Hill forts in Devon